Qaser Ben Ghashir is a town in the Tripoli District, of the Tripolitania region in northwestern Libya. It is located about 20 km south of central Tripoli. The Tripoli International Airport is located close by.

2011 Libyan civil war
In the 2011 Libyan civil war, the town was a loyalist pro-Gaddafi camp which included a prisoners of war camp. On 27 August 2011, however, rebel forces, having captured the surrounding area in the battle of Tripoli, captured the village.

References

WorldPlaces

Populated places in Tripoli District, Libya
Baladiyat of Libya